Sir John Rose (born 9 October 1952) is a British businessman who was the Chief Executive of Rolls-Royce from 1996 to 2011.

Background and education
Born in Blantyre, Malawi, Rose was educated at Culford School and Charterhouse. He earned his MA degree in psychology from the University of St. Andrews in Scotland in 1975. Before joining Rolls-Royce, he had a career in banking with the First National Bank of Chicago and Security Pacific.

He bought a small farm in South Devon. Since retiring he has done two motorbike rides with friends. One from London to Beijing and the other from Alaska to Buenos Aires.

Career with Rolls-Royce
Rose joined the company in 1984 and held a number of roles.  He served as Director of Corporate Development from 1989 to 1994, and in February 1993 assumed the role of President and Chief Executive of Rolls-Royce Inc, responsible for Rolls-Royce activities in North America.   On 1 January 1995 he became Managing Director of the Aerospace Group until he finally became the Chief Executive of the company on 1 May 1996 after serving on its Board of directors for four years.
On 30 September 2010 he announced his decision to retire from Rolls-Royce and his position of Chief Executive. He left his post at the end of March 2011 with John Rishton taking over the Chief Executive position.

Later career
In September 2011, Rose became deputy chairman of the Rothschild group, and in February 2012 become a non-executive director of Holdingham Group and subsequently Chairman of the parent company of strategic intelligence company Hakluyt&Co. He is involved with a number of environmental technology companies.

Honours
Rose received a knighthood in the 2003 New Year's Honours List. In 2008, he was made a Commandeur de la Légion d'honneur, and was also awarded the Singapore Public Service Star.

Sir John Rose is a Fellow of the Royal Aeronautical Society, a Past-President of the European Association of Aerospace Industries (AECMA), a Past-President of the Society of British Aerospace Companies and was, until recently, on the Council of The Prince's Trust as Chairman of The Prince’s Trust. He is also a member of the JP Morgan International Council, the CBI International Advisory Board, the Advisory Board of the Economic Development Board of Singapore, The Englefield Advisory Board, and the European Round Table of Industrialists.

On 13 July 2010 Sir John Rose received an honorary degree from the University of Exeter in engineering.

References

External links
 Biography of Rose from Rolls-Royce
 Rolls-Royce Group plc 2010 Half-Yearly results presentation
 RSA speech "Creating a High-Value Economy"
 Why Rolls-Royce is a real multinational champion
 Rolls-Royce sees sales doubling in 10 years as energy business grows

1952 births
Living people
Businesspeople awarded knighthoods
Rolls-Royce people
Fellows of the Royal Aeronautical Society
Alumni of the University of St Andrews
People from Blantyre
Knights Bachelor
People educated at Culford School
20th-century English businesspeople
21st-century English businesspeople